Dejan Galjen (born 25 February 2002) is a German footballer who plays as a forward for Werder Bremen II.

Career
Born in Pforzheim, Galjen started his youth career at 1899 Hoffenheim before switching to Karlsruher SC in 2019. He made his debut for Karlsruhe on 26 April 2021 as a substitute in a 0–0 draw with Erzgebirge Aue. He signed for the reserve team of Werder Bremen in July 2021, and made his debut for them on 13 August 2021 in a 3–0 Regionalliga Nord defeat to VfB Oldenburg. He made his debut for Werder Bremen as a substitute in a 0–0 draw with Karlsruher SC on 21 August 2021.

Career statistics

References

External links

2002 births
Living people
German footballers
Sportspeople from Pforzheim
Footballers from Baden-Württemberg
Association football forwards
2. Bundesliga players
TSG 1899 Hoffenheim players
Karlsruher SC players
SV Werder Bremen II players